Prophet River Wayside Provincial Park is a provincial park in British Columbia, Canada. It is located along the Prophet River, by the Alaska Highway, between the localities of Trutch and Prophet River.

As of June 4, 2007, there are no services or facilities at this park because of safety reasons. BC Parks recommends that travellers on the Alaska Highway use Buckinghorse River Wayside Provincial Park, 60 km south, or Andy Bailey Regional Park, 70 km north, instead.

See also
Prophet River Hotsprings Provincial Park
List of British Columbia Provincial Parks

References

Peace River Country
Provincial parks of British Columbia
1977 establishments in British Columbia
Protected areas established in 1977